Norman Lockhart was a Canadian politician.

Norman Lockhart may also refer to:

Norman Lockhart of the Lockhart Baronets
Norman Lockhart (footballer)
Norman Lockhart (priest)

See also
Norman Lockhart Smith
Lockhart, Norman